Grube is a surname. Notable people with the surname include:

 Adolph Eduard Grube (1812–1880), Polish zoologist
 Bruce Grube, 11th president of Georgia Southern University
 Charles Grube (1904–1976), American football player
 Chris Grube (born 1985), British sailor
 Christian Grube (born 1934), German conductor
 Ernst J. Grube (1932−2011), German historian of Islamic art and curator at the Metropolitan Museum of Art
 Frank Grube (1905–1945), American baseball player
 Franklin Grube (1831−1869), American physician and politician
 George Grube (1899–1982), classicist
 Henry Grube (died 1582), English politician
 Janice Grube, American singer-songwriter
 Jarrett Grube (born 1981), American baseball player
 Nikolai Grube, German epigrapher
 Rüdiger Grube (born 1951), engineer
 Wilfried Grube (born 1923), German former field hockey player
 Wilhelm Grube (1855–1908), German ethnographer